Juan Antonio Martínez Varela was a retired Salvadoran military officer who served as Minister of National Defense from 1999 until 2004.

Military career 

Juan Antonio Martínez Varela graduated from the Captain General Gerardo Barrios Military School in December 2004 with the rank of Second Lieutenant in the Salvadoran Air Force. He was trained to be a pilot and a flight instructor in Texas, United States, and in Israel.

He served as Chief of the General Staff of the Salvadoran Air Force from June 1993 to June 1998. He also served as the Chief of the Joint Chiefs of Staff of the Armed Forces from June 1998 until June 1999. On 1 June 1999, he was appointed as Minister of National Defense of El Salvador by President Francisco Flores Pérez and he served until 1 June 2004.

Personal life 

His father was Colonel Juan Antonio Martínez Varela who was the Director of the Captain General Gerardo Barrios Military School from 1969 to 1971, served as Minister of the Interior of El Salvador during the presidency of Alfredo Cristiani, and signed the Chapultepec Peace Accords in 1992.

He passed away on 23 February 2021.

Commands held 

Commander of the Combat Wing
Chief of Operations of the Air General Staff
Commander of the Aeronautical Military Training Center
Commander of the Second Air Brigade

Awards and decorations 

Medal to the Combatant

White Nun

References 

Living people
Salvadoran military personnel
Defence ministers of El Salvador
Captain General Gerardo Barrios Military School alumni
Year of birth missing (living people)